Cephonodes picus is a moth of the family Sphingidae described by Pieter Cramer in 1777. It is found in most of the Old World tropics, including India, the Cocos-Keeling Islands, the Maldives, Papua New Guinea, the Philippines, the Torres Strait Islands, Brunei and the Chagos Archipelago.

The wingspan is about 50 mm. The wings have uniformly narrow opaque edges. The abdomen is brown with a dark band across one abdominal segment and a dark dorsal mark on the adjacent segment.

The larvae have been recorded on Jasminum, Adina, Coffea, Gardenia, Guettarda, Morinda, Pavetta, Randia, Tarema and Nephelium. They are green with a bluish white dorsal line and white dorsolateral ones.

References

External links 
 
 "Cephonodes picus (Cramer, 1777)". Australian Caterpillars and their Butterflies and Moths. Retrieved January 7, 2018.
 

Cephonodes
Moths described in 1777